Owing to the dominance of the Google search engine, to google has become a transitive verb. The neologism commonly refers to searching for information on the World Wide Web using the Google search engine. The American Dialect Society chose it as the "most useful word of 2002". It was added to the Oxford English Dictionary on June 15, 2006, and to the eleventh edition of the Merriam-Webster Collegiate Dictionary in July 2006.

Etymology
The first recorded usage of google was as a gerund, on July 8, 1998, by Google co-founder Larry Page himself, who wrote on a mailing list: "Have fun and keep googling!". Its earliest known use as an explicitly transitive verb on American television was in the "Help" episode of Buffy the Vampire Slayer (October 15, 2002), when Willow asked Buffy, "Have you googled her yet?".

To prevent genericizing and potential loss of its trademark, Google has discouraged use of the word as a verb, particularly when used as a synonym for general web searching. On February 23, 2003, Google sent a cease and desist letter to Paul McFedries, creator of Word Spy, a website that tracks neologisms. In an article in The Washington Post, Frank Ahrens discussed the letter he received from a Google lawyer that demonstrated "appropriate" and "inappropriate" ways to use the verb "google".

It was reported that, in response to this concern, lexicographers for the Merriam-Webster Collegiate Dictionary lowercased the actual entry for the word, google, while maintaining the capitalization of the search engine in their definition, "to use the Google search engine to seek online information" (a concern which did not deter the Oxford editors from preserving the history of both "cases"). On October 25, 2006, Google sent a request to the public requesting that "You should please only use 'Google' when you're actually referring to Google Inc. and our services."

 is something that cannot be "googled"i.e. it cannot be easily found using a web search engine, especially Google. If a word or phrase is ungoogleable, it means it cannot be googled. In 2013, the Swedish Language Council attempted to include the Swedish version of the word ("ogooglebar") in its list of new words, but Google objected to the definition not being specifically related to Google, and the council was forced to briefly remove it to avoid a legal confrontation with Google.

See also

 grep
 Ogooglebar, Swedish for "ungoogleable"
 Photoshop (verb), a similar neologism referring to digital photo editing

References

Google
Verbs
Internet terminology
Internet search
1990s neologisms
Computer-related introductions in 1998